Indre By may refer to:
Indre By, Copenhagen
Indre By, Aarhus